The 2011–12 Croatian Football Cup was the twenty-first season of Croatia's football knockout competition. The defending champions were Dinamo Zagreb, having won their 11th title the previous year by defeating Varaždin in the final.

The cup kicked off with the single-legged preliminary round which was played on 24 August 2011. Most of the top flight clubs entered the competition in the following round, scheduled on 21 September 2011, with the exception of Istra 1961, Karlovac, RNK Split  and Zadar, as their cup coefficient (determined by their cup record over the last five seasons) was too low to skip the preliminary round. In addition, Lučko and Lokomotiva, two of the top level clubs, failed to qualify for the competition.

Calendar

Preliminary round
The draw for the preliminary round was held on 2 August 2011 with matches scheduled on 24 August 2011. This round consists of 16 single-legged fixtures. A total of 32 clubs entered the preliminary round: 21 regional cup winners organised at the county level and 11 regional cup finalists (from the top 11 counties with the greatest number of registered football clubs) with the exception of Međimurje.

* Match played on 23 August.

First round
First round proper consisted of 16 single-legged matches, with 16 winners of the preliminary round joined by 16 clubs with the highest cup coefficients (including 10 out of the remaining 12 top level clubs, excluding Lučko and Lokomotiva, whose cup coefficients were too low to enter competition). The draw for the first round was held on 29 August, where the club with the lowest cup coefficient hosts the one with the highest and so on. Matches were played on 20 and 21 September 2011. By the mutual agreement of Jadran Gunja and Hajduk Split, their fixture was moved to 15 September.

* Match played on 20 September.

Second round
The second round was contested by 16 winners from the first round in eight single-legged fixtures scheduled for 26 October 2011. It was the last stage of the competition employing the single leg format as from the quarter-finals onwards all fixtures were double-legged events.

* Match played on 25 October.

Quarter-finals
The eight clubs remaining in the competition after the second round were paired for the quarter-finals. From the quarter-finals onwards the ties will be played in a two-legged format. The draw was held on 28 October, first legs were played on 23 November and second legs on 30 November 2011. The tie between Dinamo Zagreb and Istra 1961 was postponed for the following year due to Dinamo's participation in European competitions. As the severe weather postponed the first round of the spring season, both clubs agreed to play the first leg  at that free slot in Pula due to better weather conditions. Dinamo Zagreb were hosts in Pula and Istra 1961 in Zagreb, as the order of legs could not be reversed.

|}

Semi-finals

First legs

Second legs

Dinamo Zagreb won 3–2 on aggregate

Osijek won 4–2 on aggregate

Final

First leg

Second leg

Dinamo Zagreb won 3–1 on aggregate

See also
2011–12 Croatian First Football League
2011–12 Croatian Second Football League

References

External links
Official website 

Croatian Football Cup seasons
Croatia
Croatian Cup, 2011-12